The General Law Amendment Act No. 76 of 1962, also known as the Sabotage Act, was an Act of the South African Parliament passed by the apartheid government.

It widened the definition of sabotage to include strikes, trade union activity, and writing slogans on walls. The maximum penalty for sabotage was hanging and the minimum five years' imprisonment. It reversed the normal burden of proof so that the accused were assumed to be guilty and had to prove their innocence. Publications opposing the government were liable to a fine of R20,000.

The Act extended the powers of the Minister of Justice, a post held in 1962 by B. J. Vorster, to ban people and organisations. Anyone who had been charged under the Suppression of Communism Act, 1950 could be banned from holding office in named institutions. Such people became known as "statutory Communists" - even if they had never actually been members of the South African Communist Party. They could be put under house arrest without trial, made to report daily to the police and be prohibited from attending social gatherings.

References

1962 in South African law
Apartheid laws in South Africa
Law enforcement in South Africa
Counterinsurgency
Cold War in Africa